Frank Brieff (19 April 1912 – 22 November 2005) was an American musician and conductor. He was the conductor of the New Haven Symphony, the Bach Aria Group, and the Waterbury Symphony. He also conducted the Columbia Symphony Orchestra.

References

1912 births
2005 deaths
American male conductors (music)
20th-century American conductors (music)
20th-century American male musicians